Fencing was contested at the 2006 Asian Games in Doha, Qatar from December 9 to December 14. Men's and women's competition took place in the Sabre, Foil, and Épée. Team competition also took place. All competition took place at Al-Arabi Indoor Hall.

Schedule

Medalists

Men

Women

Medal table

Participating nations
A total of 222 athletes from 21 nations competed in fencing at the 2006 Asian Games:

References
Final rankings

External links

 
2006
2006 Asian Games events
Asian Games
Fencing competitions in Qatar